Domo may refer to:
 Domo, Inc., American software company which specializes in business intelligence software
 Domo (NHK), the mascot of Japan's NHK television station
 Domo TV, a television series featuring NHK's character
 Domo (comics), fictional character appearing in the comic books published by Marvel
 Domo (Marvel Cinematic Universe), a fictional starship in the 2021 film Eternals named after the character
 Domo (robot), an experimental robot by MIT
 Domo Records, independent record label
 Domo Gasoline, Canadian gas retailer
 Canal+ Domo, television stations in Poland
 DOMO Group, Belgium based textiles and chemicals company
 Dream of Mirror Online, MMORPG by Aeria Games
 Domo Genesis (born 1991), American rapper and member of hip-hop collective OFWGKTA
 Domo (album), an album by Kazumasa Oda

See also
 Domo arigato (disambiguation)